Sci-Fi is the fourth studio album by American jazz bassist Christian McBride, released in 2000 via Verve. Some of the tracks are pop standards.

Reception
John Fordham of The Guardian wrote "Sci-Fi starts unpromisingly, with a rather anonymous, swoony, mixed-tempo account of Steely Dan's 1977 hit Aja that only ignites with David Gilmore's guitar solo. Yet, as it continues, US bass star McBride's typically broad-minded set emphasises both his own playing gifts and their pulling-power with some of the biggest names in the business. McBride's clarity of sound, the bullet-like impact he imparts to every note at any speed, and the distinctive turns of his lines, make him one of the most remarkable bassists in post-bop. The impact those virtues have on other players often leave you feeling that the improvisations on his albums could just be clipped out and segued into each other, with the themes dropped on the floor".

John Murph of Jazz Times stated "As the title suggests, the album has a questing quality that’s sometimes expressed in the longing melodies of Ron Blake’s tenor saxophone on “Aja,” Dianne Reeves’ celestial vocalese on “Lullaby for a Ladybug” or drummer Rodney Green’s rocketing rhythmic bursts on “Xerxes.” McBride’s robust acoustic bass alone could propel any ensemble to the stratosphere, but on Sci-Fi he adds even more ammunition to his arsenal: he plays discreet Fender Rhodes as a complement to Shedrick Mitchell’s acoustic piano. On the Wayne Shorterish title track, McBride tosses in some spacey keyboard effects, while Blake’s adventurous soprano saxophone probes right through the spacious composition, like the Enterprise warping through galactic wormholes. McBride pays tribute to two of his electric-bass heroes, Jaco Pastorius and Stanley Clarke, with “Havona” and “Butterfly Dreams,” respectively, and gives a mighty pound to the ’70s fusion with the infectious “Via Mwandishi,” which features James Carter’s bass clarinet recalling Bennie Maupin, one of the instrument’s underrated players."

Track listing

Personnel
Band
 Christian McBride – bass (upright, electric), keyboards, production
 Ron Blake – sax (tenor, soprano)
 Shedrick Mitchell – piano, electric piano
 Rodney Green – drums
 Herbie Hancock – piano (on "Xerxes" and "Lullaby for a Ladybug")
 Dianne Reeves – vocalese (on "Lullaby for a Ladybug")
 Toots Thielemans – harmonica
 James Carter – bass clarinet
 David Gilmore – guitar (acoustic, electric)

Production
 Joe Ferla – recording, mixing

Chart performance

References

External links
 Christian McBride Discography
 

Verve Records albums
Christian McBride albums
2000 albums